A dockominium is the water-based version of a condominium; rather than owning an apartment in a building, one owns a boat slip on the water. The term is a portmanteau of "dock" and "condominium." In addition to the exclusive right to use the boat slip, ownership also provides one with the right to use the common elements of the marina, much the same as one would have the right to use the common areas in a residential condominium development. Also, unit owners may use, rent, or sell their unit at any time, subject to association approval.

Dockominium

Similar to a condominium, a management company manages the common areas and provides all required services such as maintenance, security, insurance, bookkeeping, legal, and overall management and supervision of the dockominium facility.  A monthly fee is charged to cover these expenses.  Typically, water is included, while electricity and cable, etc. are billed separately via the management association. Real estate taxes are separately assessed by the municipality and are the responsibility of the unit owner.

Purpose

A dockominium is created when a marina converts or sells individual slips to individual owners. Traditionally, marinas are in the business of renting or leasing space. A comparison would be the conversion of a rental apartment to a condominium. An association is created that monitors the maintenance and operation of the marina. Individual owners are responsible for paying their monthly, quarterly, or annual association dues and for paying their own property taxes assessed on the slip. Dockominium conversions are a popular trend taking place in the marina industry in high demand areas focusing on the luxury markets.

Limits

However, despite the advantages, whether or not dockominium sales are legal varies according to laws of each area. Few marina owners also own the land under the water, and most have only an easement to the property. Individual unit sales may violate law, thus following the legal concept of the public trust doctrine that provides that public trust lands, waters, and living resources in a state are held by the State in trust for the benefit of all of the people.

See also
 Condominium
 Marina
 Real estate

Coastal construction
Condominium